Theodorus Stephanus Gerardus Johannes Marie (Steef) van Schaik (8 December 1888, in Druten – 10 September 1968, in Arnhem) was a Dutch politician.

Van Schaik was a Roman Catholic entrepreneur and government minister. He made a career at the Algemene Kunstzijde Unie in Arnhem. As a technocrat he became minister of Traffic and Energy in the cabinet-Schermerhorn/Drees. Upon him fell the difficult task to repair the heavily destroyed infrastructure as well as the detrimental fuel supply of The Netherlands just after World War II. After 1948 he became chief executive of the Algemene Kunstzijde Unie.

Steef was a brother of the well-known Dutch politician Josef van Schaik.

References

1888 births
1968 deaths
People from Druten
Dutch Roman Catholics
Roman Catholic State Party politicians
Catholic People's Party politicians
20th-century Dutch politicians
20th-century Dutch businesspeople
Ministers of Transport and Water Management of the Netherlands
Delft University of Technology alumni